Rumilly is a commune in the Pas-de-Calais department in the Hauts-de-France region of France.

Geography
Rumilly is located 12 miles (19 km) northeast of Montreuil-sur-Mer on the D148 road, in the valley of the Aa river.

Population

Places of interest
 The church of Notre-Dame-de-l'Assomption, dating from the eighteenth century
 A seventeenth-century priory
 A sixteenth-century chapel

See also
 Communes of the Pas-de-Calais department

References

Communes of Pas-de-Calais